</noinclude>

Punjabi-Canadian organized crime is made up of groups that are based in Canada and is made up predominantly of young adults and teenagers of Punjabi ethnic, cultural and linguistic background, while ethnically they typically are Jatt Sikh's. Collectively, these groups are among the Top 5 major homegrown organized crime hierarchy across the nation in Canada coming in 3rd place, after the Asian Triads and White biker gangs.  The 2004 RCMP British Columbia Annual Police Report ranked them third in terms of organization and sophistication in British Columbia, ranked behind the outlaw motorcycle clubs and aforementioned Chinese criminal organizations such as the Triads drug clans.

History
Some of the young men involved today in crime may come from first-generation backgrounds but the majority are second and third-generation Punjabi-Canadians. These individuals were initially involved in petty street crimes, but older and more calculating criminals from the community quickly saw opportunities to make a profit from the situation. Often using clan-based ties and connections in their ancestral homeland, mainly in the parts of the Punjab, organized criminals from there were able to build criminal empires making use of young street gangs. During the period 2006 to 2014, 34South Asians made up 21.3% of gang related deaths in British Columbia.

In the 1980s, there was a violent struggle to have the Punjab break away from India to found a new state to be called Khalistan ("the land of the pure"). In June 1984, the Indian Prime Minister, Indira Gandhi, had the Indian Army storm the most sacred site for Sikhs, the Golden Temple or the Darbar Sahib ("abode of God") in Amritsar, which had been taken over by armed Sikh separatists. During the ensuing battle between 5-8 June 1984, the Darbar Sahib was severely damaged with over 492 deaths, the incident was seen by many Sikhs around the world as a massacre and a declaration of war by India upon their community.In Canada, some members in the Sikh community started to engage in revolutionary activities in support of Khalistan. Though the intention was initially political, some of the activists also started to engage in organized crime as a way to raise money for the struggle. Ranjit "Ron" Dosanjh, the president of the Vancouver chapter of the separatist International Sikh Youth Federation, became the leader alongside his brother Jimsher "Jimmy" Dosanjh of the Dosanjh gang.   

One man who led the gangster lifestyle was Gurmit Singh Dhak, leader of the once prominent Dhak gang. After being arrested in the early 2000's with kilos of drugs and a loaded firearm, Dhak was contacted by the Odd Squad of the Royal Canadian Mounted Police about making an anti-gang video for high school students, supposedly in return for a lightened prison sentence. In a video made in June 2010, Dhak stated the swaggering aggression of the gangsters is not reality, as he stated that to live the life of a gangster was to live in fear, never knowing when someone would try to kill him and never knowing who to trust. Dhak stated: "...if I could turn back time, I would never do it again. Every day I've got to look over my shoulder; I've got to worry about my family, I've got to worry about, if I jump out of my car, am I going to get shot? Or, you know, I could be walking in the mall and walking out and getting shot. I don't know...Oh, I want to get out. But it's too late now to get out. I have too many enemies". On 16 October 2010, Dhak was found shot dead in the driver's seat of his black BMW SUV, which was parked in the parking lot of the Metrotown Mall in Burnaby. His murder remains unsolved. 

Rivals have posted rap songs advocating murder such as a young man from Surrey, alleged to have committed two murders and charged by RCMP, posted an online tribute to the murdered Gavinder Grewal, the deceased founder of the Brothers Keepers gang. Tyrel Nguyen Quesnelle, using his rapper "T-Sav", boosted in his rap song My Life that he  was willing to both kill and die for his deceased gang-leader, Grewal. T-sav rapped in his song: "They took GG from us, realest trapper ever living. I swear we riding out for you till they all ain't living." and "I caught my first body when you was in school...Brothers Keepers, that's a life contract, little nigga." The police in the Lower Mainland maintain that songs glorying violence and criminality while boasting about drug dealing and murder are increasing tensions between gangs.

The Brothers Keepers are not the only gang threatening their enemies musically as in the fall of 2019 , after he was released from a jail, the rapper Lolo Lanski posted his song Dedman to SoundCloud and YouTube. As of 24 January 2020, the song had 80,000 downloads. The song which denounces the Brother Keepers and describes how Grewal was shot inside his penthouse home in 2017. The lyrics of Dedman admiringly declare that the killer “sent lead to his head” and the assassination was “trying to put a BK [Brother's Keeper] on TV." In a bizarre note,  Dedman includes an audio excerpt of the 911 call made by Grewal's brother Manbir after he found his brother's corpse in the penthouse. The use of rap in the present underworld conflict between the Brothers Keepers vs. both the Kang group and the United Nations gang is new, but police in B.C. have stated they have witnessed an overlap between rap and the underworld subculture before.

A major drug bust conducted in April 2021 broke up an Punjabi-Canadian trafficking network primarily based in Brampton, Ontario. Of the 28 arrested, the majority were India-born Punjabi men. Police seized $2.3 million worth of drugs including 10 kilograms of cocaine, eight kilograms of ketamine, three kilograms of heroin and 2.5 kilograms of opium. Additionally, 48 firearms and $730,000 in Canadian currency were seized as part of the bust. This criminal network was reported by York Regional Police, Toronto Police Services, Peel Regional Police, RCMP and the DEA to operate as far as Western Canada, California and India.

Activities
Gangs and criminal organizations within the Punjabi-Canadian community have also been noted for adopting the rigid structure and rules of the Punjabi Mafia, with strict rules against talking to police and against any kind of drug use amongst members and associates aside from alcohol or cigarettes use, though excessive use of these substances is also allegedly met with punishment within the gangs.

The main trade of the Punjabi-Canadian crime groups are the Murder-for-hire operations run by these criminal groups, along with Arms trafficking, Racketeering, Extortion, the trafficking of cocaine, heroin, MDMA, Methamphetamine and Cannabis (drug), and originally carried out Assassinations. Punjabi-Canadian crime bosses use their family connections in the Punjab to bring in the heroin drug from the "Golden Crescent" nation of Afghanistan, where much of the world's heroin is produced. Punjabi-Canadian crime groups widened the reach of their activities and delved into other crimes such as kidnapping, loan sharking, money laundering and chop shop. Organized gangs from the community have used the local transportation business, setting up connections with Mexican drug cartels and using truck drivers to smuggle cocaine from Mexico into the United States and Canada, in exchange for MDMA, Methamphetamine, Cannabis (drug) and hashish for the cartels. The profits of drug dealing allows for contract killing.

Criminal groups 
Most Punjabi-Canadian crime groups in B.C, Ontario and Alberta are either several clans controlled by one family with friends and relatives associated with the group or sometimes networks of truck drivers involved in cross-border drug smuggling that are classified as gangs. The largest organized Punjabi-Canadian gang presence is in British Columbia, Alberta and Ontario.

The largest crime groups are:

 Brothers Keepers Gang: Founded by Gavinder Singh Grewal and most of the gangs members and leadership formerly made up the Red Scorpions leadership, but split off to its own group and allegedly targeted remaining Red Scorpions members across British Columbia cities beginning in Spring 2016 and heating up in Fall 2017. This organization is active mainly in Metro Vancouver but is believed to have made inroads into all across British Columbia, Alberta, Manitoba and Ontario and the American states of Washington, Oregon, Minnesota and Montana. Since the founding of the gang, some prominent figures have been targeted and slayed including founder Gavinder “Gavin” Grewal whose brother later found him dead in his apartment in North Vancouver November 2017. Harb Singh Dhaliwal was gunned down outside Cardero’s Restaurant in a brazen shooting. His brother Meninder, chased the assailant and stabbed him in the eye. Brothers Jaskeert Singh and Gurkeert Singh Kalkat were murdered only nine days apart in mid May 2021. Jaskeert was a prime suspect in the murder of high profile and long-time United Nations gangster Karman Singh Grewal at YVR on Mother’s Day. On July 25, 2022 Meninder Dhaliwal and friend Satindera Singh Gill were gunned down outside a busy hotel in the Whistler Ski Village of B.C. Meninder along with his brother Barinder were put on a list along with four others as gangsters who pose a risk to themselves and to the public. He was the second main suspect along with Jaskeert Kalkat as the men who murdered Karman Grewal. Meninder’s alleged killers were apprehended by RCMP within a couple hours. One of them Gursimran Sahota had close ties to Karman. Both Sahota and Tanvir Khak are alleged UN members.
 Dhak-Duhre Group: Included the United Nations in the coalition as well and this group was alleged to be active across British Columbia and Alberta. Although some of the original leaders such as Sandip Singh Duhre, Gurmit Singh Dhak and Sukhveer Singh Dhak have been killed, the associates of the murdered leaders are suspected by RCMP to remain connected to crime groups themselves. The Dhak-Duhre coalition is known to have strong ties the UN gang and is known to have waged a war against the Wolf Pack alliance, a gang alliance composed of the Independent Soldiers gang, the Red Scorpions gang  and the Hells Angels.
 Dhaliwal Crime Family: Operating across the cities of Toronto, Missisauga, Vaughan and the major cities of Quebec, by a family, originally from Malton, Mississauga; the Dhaliwal crime family has been raided numerous times, first in 1996 for running a $45 million a year organized crime group, which made $16 million a year solely from the stolen vehicle operations but also heavily engaged in everything from armed robberies to importing cocaine and heroin for trafficking, extortion, arms trafficking, murder, warm-up thefts of cars and kidnapping rival traffickers, police alleged. The Dhaliwal crime family founded and led by patriarch Balwinder Singh "Bill" Dhaliwal, 65 years old as of 2022, who was infamously dubbed the "King of Car Thieves" in an episode of the Canadian TV Series Masterminds. The crime family has been raided a total of five times by the RCMP and Toronto Police Services, with $15 Million in stolen goods being seized in the fourth and second-last police operation in 2016. They are currently estimated to be making a profit of 70 - 280 million on an annual basis.
 Independent Soldiers Gang: Consisting mostly of Punjabis and later, numerous other ethnicities , the gang was founded in Vancouver in the early 1990's. Canadians of Punjabi and Euro-Canadian ethnicities make up most of the gang. This organization is part of the Wolf Pack and was founded as the "sunset boys" and this gang was involved in the 2009 Vancouver gang war.
 Kang Crime Group: Formerly a part of the Brothers Keepers organization but due to differences between members over financial disputes, had splintered and formed a new organization which is also called the "BIBO" Gang(Blood In, Blood Out Gang), named after the 1993 film Blood In Blood Out. The Kang Crime Group was founded by brothers Sameet Singh "Sam" Kang and Gary Singh Kang and the group is known to be in a war with the Brothers Keepers for control of territory in Metro Vancouver, the Lower Mainland and across Vancouver Island. This organization is thought to be based in Burnaby, British Columbia but its presence is thought to extend throughout British Columbia and Alberta. According to court witness testimony along with police surveillance and drug seizures throughout "Project Territory"; detectives, intelligence analysts and prosecutors concluded that the Kang Group had been a supplier for the Red Scorpions gang and had been suppliers for the leader of the RS Gang outside of prison, Kyle Latimer. Some of the founding members are in jail. Randy Kang along with his younger brother Gary Kang were shot on October 27, 2017. Randy died on the scene while Gary lived. This is what most likely caused the revenge killing of Gavin Grewal. On January 6, 2021 Gary Kang was murdered inside his South Surrey home in the Morgan Creek Neighbourhood, while Sameet (Sam) Kang is suspected to control the gang from prison. 
 Malli-Buttar Coalition: This coalition was made up of two groups, one led by Tejinder Singh Malli and the other led by the Buttar brothers; Baljit(Bal), Manjit(Mani) and Kuljit(Kelly), operating across British Columbia and Alberta, the group was known to operate at a high level. This group is now almost semi-defunct after the imprisonment of most of its members. This organization was the other group involved in the 2009 Vancouver gang war.
 Punjabi Mafia: Was alleged to be made up of the Dosanjh group, Johal group and Buttar group. Parts of it other than the Buttar and Johal group are considered to be somewhat dismantled, with factions of the Johal and Buttar groups allegedly still operating. The Punjabi Mafia was originally founded by Ranjit Cheema, the Dosanjh Brothers and Robbie Kandola with a rival faction being controlled by Bindy Johal before his death.
 The Ruffians: A gang made up entirely of international students from Punjab, India, some of whom had travelled to Canada for studies and job opportunities, this gang is claimed by police to have been founded in Abbotsford while operating across British Columbia municipalities in criminal activities such as contract killing, Drug trafficking, money laundering, murder, weapon trafficking, illegal gambling, robbery, chop shop, assault, loan sharking, extortion and kidnapping. The Ruffians is alleged to have upto 300 members and was founded in 2019 by international students with purported ties to the Kang Crime Group(Blood In, Blood Out Gang), according to Vancouver police.
 Sanghera Crime Family: Founded by Uddham Singh Sanghera, this crime family was believed by police to be responsible for over 100 shootings in the 2009 Vancouver gang war in Vancouver. The Vancouver Police Department has targeted and for the most part been able to capture members of the group. The courts have sentenced members of the Sanghera family to prison terms although the remnants of the organization are alleged to be active.
 Sandhu-Sidhu Group: Founded by leaders Jimi “Slice” Sandhu and Sandeep Sidhu, this group is mostly based out the Townline Hill Neighbourhood of Abbotsford B.C. They have mostly been at odds with the Dhaliwal- Grewal-Kang coalition that was apart of the Red Scorpions before splintering themselves. They remain at odds with the  Dhaliwal-Grewal group a la the “Brothers Keepers” and the Red Scorpion “Kang-Latimer” faction. They are well known allies of the UN gang as well as the remaining members of the Dhak-Dhure Group.  On January 2, 2014 Red Scorpion acting leader Matt Campbell was stabbed in the neck by Sandhu as they bumped into each other coincidentally at the Abbotsford Auto Mall. He was charged with second-degree murder but the charges were later stayed. Sandhu was deported to India in early 2016 but was still making appearances in Canada while deported. On February 4, 2022 Sandhu was gunned down outside his Thailand Villa by two ex Army Rangers from the Canadian Military.

See also
List of gangs in Canada

Punjabi Canadians

2009 Vancouver gang war

References

External links
 http://www.warriorsreligion.com/resources/deathlist
 http://indocanadiangangs.blogspot.ca/

 
Gangs in Vancouver